Brian David Sidari (born April 19, 1973) is a United States Space Force brigadier general who serves as the director of intelligence of the United States Space Command. A career intelligence officer, he has commanded 6th Intelligence Squadron and previously served as vice commander of the 480th Intelligence, Surveillance, and Reconnaissance Wing.

Early life and education 
Sidari is native of Macedonia, Ohio. He received a B.A. degree in political science in 1995 from Kent State University. He later earned M.S. degrees from Air Command and Staff College and the National Defense University.

Military career 

Sidari entered the United States Air Force on June 1, 1995, after receiving his commission as a second lieutenant from the Kent State University’s Reserve Officer Training Corps program. His first assignment was as assistant regional director of assignments at The Pennsylvania University. After that, he was a student for a year with the 315th Weapons Squadron at Goodfellow Air Force Base, Texas. In December 2017, he was assigned as squadron support flight commander and chief of intelligence of the 22nd Training Squadron. After more than a year, he was reassigned to the 93rd Air Control Wing as the airborne intelligence officer, wing executive officer, and flight commander. From July 2002 to May 2005, he was assigned to the Air Staff as the chief of ISR strategy and doctrine, Northrop Grumman RQ-4 Global Hawk functional manager, and chief of predator operations and operations.

Sidari became a field grade officer when he was promoted to major on October 1, 2005, by which time he was assigned at the National Airborne Operations Center at Offutt Air Force Base, Nebraska. After that assignment, he studied for a year at Air Command and Staff College. From September 2007 to July 2009, he was the 390th Intelligence Squadron's director of operations. He was then assigned to the Joint Staff for two years as counter-terrorism operations officer. In July 2011, he took command of 6th Intelligence Squadron at Osan Air Base, South Korea. After his two-year command tour, he was assigned to Air Force Space Command, and there he served as chief of special programs integration division and as executive officer to Major General David J. Buck.

In July 2015, Sidari pursued his senior development education at the Joint Advanced Warfighting School of the National Defense University. After his schooling, he went back to the Joint Staff as the chief of the assessments and plants division where he was promoted to colonel on November 1, 2016. After his tour in the Joint Staff, he became the vice commander of the 480th Intelligence, Surveillance and Reconnaissance Wing for two years. In June 2020, he was assigned as director of intelligence, surveillance, and reconnaissance of Headquarters, United States Space Force in Peterson Air Force Base, Colorado, which was later redesignated to Space Operations Command.

Sidari transferred to the United States Space Force after his nomination was approved on June 24, 2021. In May 2022, he was nominated and confirmed for promotion to brigadier general. By August 2022, he was frocked, and he was promoted to brigadier general on October 2, 2022.

In 2022, Sidari became the director of intelligence of the United States Space Command.

Awards and decorations 
Sidari is the recipient of the following awards:

Dates of promotion

Writings

References 

	

Year of birth missing (living people)
Living people
United States Air Force colonels
United States Space Force generals